The 11th Security Force Assistance Brigade is a brigade of the British Army which is intended to train and assist foreign forces. In 2021, under the Future Army changes, the brigade was redesignated, formerly being the 11th Infantry Brigade & HQ South East. Prior to the Army 2020 changes in 2013, the brigade was temporarily activated for deployment to Afghanistan, and before that engaged during the two World Wars.

First World War
The 11th Infantry Brigade was formed in 1914 as 11th Brigade was part of the 4th Division. It was one of the British units sent overseas to France on the outbreak of the First World War in August 1914. It was part of the British Expeditionary Force and fought on the Western Front for the next four years.

Second World War

The 11th Infantry Brigade was originally part of the 4th Infantry Division as it was during the First World War, serving with it during the Battle of France and was evacuated from Dunkirk in late May 1940. It remained with the division in the United Kingdom up until 6 June 1942 when it was reassigned to join 78th Infantry Division (commanded by Vyvyan Evelegh, a previous commander of the brigade) which was being newly formed to take part in Operation Torch, the Allied landings in French North Africa, as part of the British First Army (commanded by Kenneth Anderson, also a previous commander of the brigade). The brigade landed in North Africa at Algiers in November 1942 and fought with 78th Division throughout the Tunisian campaign which ended with the Axis surrender in May 1943. It then served with 78th Division throughout the campaigns in Sicily and Italy.

Structure 
In 1942 the brigade comprised the following units:
 Headquarters, 11th Infantry Brigade & Signal Section
 2nd Battalion, The Lancashire Fusiliers
 1st Battalion, East Surrey Regiment
 5th (Huntingdon) Battalion, Northamptonshire Regiment

Commanders
Commanders included:
 Brigadier-General Aylmer Hunter-Weston (February 1914)
  Brigadier-General Julian Hasler (26 February-27 April 1915)
 Lieutenant-Colonel F. R. Hicks (27 April 1915 - acting)
 Brigadier-General Charles Bertie Prowse (29 April 1915)
 Major W. A. T. B. Somerville (1 July 1916 - acting)
 Brigadier-General H. C. Rees (3 July 1916)
 Brigadier-General R. A. Berners (7 December 1916)
 Lieutenant-Colonel F. A. W. Armitage (15 October 1917 - acting)
 Brigadier-General T. S. H. Wade (21 October 1917)
 Brigadier-General W. J. Webb-Bowen (19 September 1918)
 Brigadier Kenneth Anderson: 1938–1940
 Brigadier Brian Horrocks: 1940
 Brigadier John Grover: 1940–1941
 Brigadier Vyvyan Evelegh: 1941
 Brigadier Guy Francis Gough: 1941–1942
 Brigadier Edward Cass: 1942–1943
 Brigadier Keith Arbuthnott: 1943–1944
 Brigadier John Alexander Mackenzie: 1944
 Brigadier Gerald Ernest Thubron: 1944–1945

Post war
In January 1946, following the end of the campaign in Europe, the brigade was dissolved and its units dispersed to other brigades and commands.  In 1950, the brigade was reformed in West Germany.

The organisation of the brigade during the 1950s was as follows:

 Brigade Headquarters, at Kingsley Barracks, Minden
 9th Queen's Royal Lancers, at Lothian Barracks, Detmold (Armoured role, with Centurion main battle tanks)
 1st Battalion, The Sherwood Foresters (Nottinghamshire & Derbyshire Regiment), at Dempsey Barracks, Sennelager
 1st Battalion, The Manchester Regiment, at Clifton Barracks, Minden – merged with the King's Liverpool Regiment on 1 September 1958 to form the King's Regiment
 1st Battalion, The Dorset Regiment, at Elizabeth Barracks, Minden – from April 1956, merged with the Devonshire Regiment in 1958 to form the Devonshire and Dorset Regiment

On 1 April 1956, the 4th Infantry Division was reformed in the BAOR, and its brigades: 10th, 11th, and 12th was reformed by conversion of the old 61st Lorried Infantry Brigade based in Minden.  In 1958, following the 1957 Defence White Paper, the brigade was redesignated as 11th Infantry Brigade Group and shifted to the 2nd Division.  And in 1964, the brigade was transferred to the 1st Division, sitting alongside the 7th Armoured Brigade Group.  In February 1961, the brigades were reorganisation, and the infantry brigade groups became organised as equivalents of a modern brigade combat team: signal squadron, armoured regiment, 3 x infantry battalions, field artillery regiment, engineer squadron, and one AAC reconnaissance flight.

The brigade's structure following its conversion to a brigade group was as follows:

 Brigade Headquarters, at Kingsley Barracks, Minden
 7th Royal Tank Regiment, at Haig Barracks, Hohne – merged with 4th Royal Tank Regiment on 3 April 1959
 4th Royal Tank Regiment – from April 1959
 1st Battalion, North Staffordshire Regiment (Prince of Wales's), at Clifton Barracks, Minden
 1st Battalion, The South Wales Borderers – from June 1959
 1st Battalion, The Highland Light Infantry (City of Glasgow Regiment), at Alma Barracks, Lüneburg
 1st Battalion, Middlesex Regiment (Duke of Cambridge's Own) – from November 1958
 1st Battalion, The Royal Lincolnshire Regiment, at Elizabeth Barracks, Minden – from June 1958
 19th Field Regiment, Royal Artillery, at Saint George's Barracks, Minden (Field artillery; 18 x Ordnance QF 25-pdr howitzers)
 25 Field Squadron, Royal Engineers, at Saint George's Barracks, Minden

In November 1965, the brigades became 'brigades' once again, and dropped their 'brigade group' designations and also dropped their support units.  In October 1966, just after the publication of the 1966 Defence White Paper, the 7th Armoured and 11th Infantry brigades experimented with a new brigade organisation with two armoured regiments and two 'mechanised' battalions equipped with the new FV432 armoured personnel carrier.  With the increasing availability of the new vehicle, all of the infantry battalions within the BAOR were to become mechanised.

The brigade's structure just before conversion was as follows:

 Brigade Headquarters, at Kingsley Barracks, Minden
 211 Signal Squadron (Infantry Brigade Group), Royal Corps of Signals, at Kingsley Barracks, Minden
 The Royal Scots Greys (2nd Dragoons), at Wessex Barracks, Fallingbostel
 1st Battalion, The Royal Warwickshire Fusiliers, at Gordon Barracks, Hameln
 1st Battalion, The Duke of Edinburgh's Royal Regiment (Berkshire & Wiltshire) – from June 1966
 16th/5th The Queen's Royal Lancers – in infantry role from June 1969
 1st Battalion, The Royal Welch Fusiliers, at Saint George's Barracks, Minden
 1st Battalion, The Gordon Highlanders – from April 1967
 15th/19th The King's Royal Hussars – in infantry role from November 1969
 1st Battalion, The Black Watch (Royal Highland Regiment), at Elizabeth Barracks, Minden
 1st Battalion, The Sherwood Foresters (Nottinghamshire & Derbyshire Regiment) – from March 1968

As a result of the above defence white paper and experimentations, the BAOR was completely reorganised with the 11th Infantry Brigade becoming an armoured formation in the end of 1970.  The new formation, 11th Armoured Brigade, was reformed, thus ending the infantry lineage.

Twenty-first century

Afghanistan 
On 15th October 2007, Helmand Task Force 11 formed its planning cell at Aldershot Garrison, expanding into 11th Light Brigade in November 2007 for deployment to Afghanistan (Operation Herrick).  The brigade was stood up alongside 52nd Infantry Brigade thus providing the Army with two infantry brigades available for deployment to either Afghanistan (Operation Herrick) or Iraq (Operation Telic).

On 10th October 2009, the brigade deployed to Helmand Province, replacing 19th Light Brigade and would remain until April 2010. The brigade's order of battle on deployment to Afghanistan was as follows alongside the formation they had been part of:

 Brigade Headquarters
 11th Light Brigade Headquarters & 261 Signal Squadron, Royal Corps of Signals (101st Logistic Brigade)
 Household Cavalry Regiment (1st Mechanised Brigade)
 1st Battalion, Grenadier Guards (London District)
 2nd Battalion (The Green Howards), Yorkshire Regiment (19th Light Brigade)
 1st Battalion (Royal Welch Fusiliers), The Royal Welsh (1st Mechanised Brigade)
 3rd Battalion, The Rifles (52nd Infantry Brigade)
 1st Regiment, Royal Horse Artillery (3rd (UK) Mechanised Division)
 28th Engineer Regiment, Royal Engineers (1st (UK) Armoured Division)
 10th (Queen's Own Gurkha) Logistic Regiment, Royal Logistic Corps (101st Logistic Brigade)
 104th Force Support Battalion, Royal Electrical and Mechanical Engineers (Equipment Support, Theatre Troops)
 33rd Field Hospital, Royal Army Medical Corps (2nd Medical Brigade)
 160 Provost Company, Royal Military Police, Adjutant General's Corps (4th Regiment, Royal Military Police)

On the brigade's return in April 2010, a total of 650 soldiers from the 12 regiments of the brigade marched through Winchester in Hampshire accompanied by three bands to celebrate their return.  Later in June, around 120 soldiers then marched past the Palace of Westminster (Parliament of the United Kingdom).

Just a few months after the brigade's return in 2010, the brigade was disbanded and its units returned to their peacetime headquarters.

Army 2020 
In 2012, following the Strategic Defence and Security Review 2010, the Army 2020 programme was announced. As part of the mergers, the 2nd (South East) Infantry Brigade, which had regional responsibility for the south east counties (Kent, Surrey, and Sussex), and 145th (South) Brigade, which had regional responsibility for the south-central region (Thames Valley (Berkshire, Buckinghamshire, and Oxfordshire), Hampshire, and the Isle of Wight) were merged to form the new 11th Infantry Brigade and Headquarters South East.

The brigade's organisation was as follows by 2015:

 Brigade Headquarters, at Taurus House, Aldershot Garrison
 1st Battalion, Welsh Guards, at Elizabeth Barracks, Pirbright Camp (Light Mechanised Infantry with Foxhound armoured cars)
 1st Battalion, Grenadier Guards, at Lille Barracks, Aldershot Garrison (Light Infantry)
 1st Battalion, The Royal Gurkha Rifles, at Sir John Moore Barracks, Shorncliffe (Light Infantry)
 The London Regiment (Army Reserve), HQ in Westminster (Light Infantry) – paired with the Grenadier Guards
 3rd Battalion, The Royal Welsh (Army Reserve), HQ in Cardiff (Light Infantry) – paired with the Welsh Guards

Army 2020 Refine 
In 2017, a supplement to the Army 2020 programme was announced entitled the Army 2020 Refine which reversed many of the unit-level changes.  In addition to the unit level changes, several of the regional brigades formed under the initial Army 2020 programme were disbanded or reduced to Colonel-level commands. In 2019, a Field Army reorganisation saw these brigades lose their units permanently with the following changes occurring to the former units: Grenadier Guards and Welsh Guards transferred to London District (on rotation) and replaced by the Coldstream Guards and Irish Guards respectively, Royal Gurkha Rifles moved to 16th Air Assault Brigade, The London Regiment transferred to London District, and the 3rd Royal Welsh moved to the 12th Armoured Infantry Brigade.

Under the changes, the Coldstream and Irish Guards moved from London District, the 3rd Princess of Wales's Royal Regiment moved from 7th Infantry Brigade, and the 1st and 2nd Battalions, Royal Irish Regiment moved from 160th (Welsh) Brigade.

In 2019 with the brigade completely reorganised, its structure was now as follows by the end of 2021:

 Brigade Headquarters, at Taurus House, Aldershot Garrison
 1st Battalion, Irish Guards, at Lille Barracks, Aldershot Garrison (Light Mechanised Infantry with Foxhound armoured cars)
 1st Battalion, The Royal Irish Regiment, at Clive Barracks, Ternhill (Light Mechanised Infantry with Foxhound armoured cars)
 1st Battalion, Coldstream Guards, at Victoria Barracks, Windsor (Light Infantry)
 3rd Battalion, The Princess of Wales's Royal Regiment (Army Reserve), HQ at Leros Barracks, Canterbury
 2nd Battalion, The Royal Irish Regiment (Army Reserve), HQ at Thiepval Barracks, Lisburn

11th Security Force Assistance Brigade 
On 30 November 2021, the Future Soldier changes were announced, and the brigade will transition from an infantry brigade into a security force assistance formation. In late 2021, the brigade was renamed as 11th Security Force Assistance Brigade, dropping its regional commitments, and will reorganise by 2022. The brigade's mission was described as follows:

The brigade headquarters will remain in Aldershot, drop its regional commitments, and unit moves will be as follows: Coldstream Guards move to 4th Light Brigade Combat Team (BCT) – formerly 4th Infantry Brigade & HQ North East; 2nd Royal Irish Regiment move to 19th Reserve Brigade – a new formation; 3rd Princess of Wales's Royal Regiment moved to 20th Armoured BCT as mechanised infantry; 1st Royal Irish Regiment moves to 16th Air Assault Brigade as 'light strike reconnaissance infantry'; and the Irish Guards will remain part of the brigade.  The following units will join the brigade in 2022: The Black Watch (3rd Battalion, Royal Regiment of Scotland) from 51st Infantry Brigade; 1st Royal Anglian Regiment from British Forces Cyprus (will join on return from Cyprus in 2023); 3rd The Rifles joins in 2024 from 51st Infantry Brigade; 4th Princess of Wales's Royal Regiment joins from 7th Infantry Brigade; and finally the Outreach and Cultural Support Group will join from 77th Brigade.

The brigade's structure by 2025 will therefore be as follows:

 Brigade Headquarters, at Taurus House, Aldershot Garrison
 1st Battalion, Irish Guards, at Lille Barracks, Aldershot Garrison
 The Black Watch, 3rd Battalion, The Royal Regiment of Scotland, at Fort George, Inverness – to move to Leuchars Station not before 2029
 1st Battalion, The Royal Anglian Regiment, at Alexander Barracks, Dhekelia Cantonment, Cyprus – to move to Kendrew Barracks, Cottesmore in 2023 and join the brigade that same year
 3rd Battalion, The Rifles, at Dreghorn Barracks, Edinburgh – to move to Weeton Barracks, Blackpool not before 2027 and join the brigade in 2024
 4th Battalion, The Princess of Wales's Royal Regiment (Army Reserve), HQ in Redhill
 Outreach and Cultural Support Group (77th Brigade), at Denison Barracks, Hermitage – to move to Alexander Barracks, Pirbright Camp not before 2027

The brigade led a programme to train members of the Armed Forces of Ukraine during the Russo-Ukrainian War as part of Operation Orbital (20152022) and Operation Interflex (2022).

See also 

 Security Force Assistance Brigade

Footnotes

References

External links
 Official web page

Infantry brigades of the British Army in World War I
Infantry brigades of the British Army in World War II
Infantry brigades of the British Army
Military units and formations established in 2021
Future Soldier
Military advisory groups